DHI may refer to:
 Dhi (Hindu thought), a concept
 DHI (company), a water environment research, consulting and software organisation from Denmark
 DHI Group, Inc, owner of employment websites
 Deutsches Historisches Institut, the German Historical Institutes present in several international cities
  (IATA airport code), Dhangarhi, Nepal
 Dignitatis Humanae Institute, a Catholic-inspired NGO based in Rome
 Dhimal language (ISO 639-3 language code), a Sino-Tibetan language of Nepal
 EMD DHI, an experimental diesel-hydraulic railroad locomotive
 5,6-dihydroxyindole, a chemical compound constituent of melanin